Andrey Shuvalov (born 8 January 1965) is a Soviet fencer. He won three bronze medals in the épée events at the 1988 and 1992 Summer Olympics.

References

External links
 

1965 births
Living people
Russian male fencers
Soviet male fencers
Olympic fencers of the Soviet Union
Olympic fencers of the Unified Team
Fencers at the 1988 Summer Olympics
Fencers at the 1992 Summer Olympics
Olympic bronze medalists for the Soviet Union
Olympic bronze medalists for the Unified Team
Olympic medalists in fencing
Medalists at the 1988 Summer Olympics
Medalists at the 1992 Summer Olympics